Mira Suhonen (née Nevansuu; born July 9, 1985, in Kuortane) is a Finnish female sport shooter, mainly competing in 10 metre pistol. Her best result has been a silver medal at the 2007 European Shooting Championship. She has participated in the Summer Olympics twice. In 2008 she finished 7th but in 2012 she failed to reach the final.

References

Finnish female sport shooters
1985 births
Living people
People from Kuortane
Olympic shooters of Finland
Shooters at the 2012 Summer Olympics
Shooters at the 2008 Summer Olympics
Sportspeople from South Ostrobothnia